The Wildlife Game Refuges Act of 1916 placed aside certain United States Federal park lands as nature reserves free from hunting and poaching, and placed the United States Forest Service in charge of enforcing such provisions.  The purpose was to increase the total big-game population (both inside and outside the game refuges), using the ecological principle of refuges.

See also
 Game reserve
 Refuge (ecology)

References

1916 in American law
United States federal legislation